Jibber Jabber (also known as Jibber and Jabber) is a Canadian children's television series about the brothers Jibber and Jabber, who like to imagine things.

Characters
 Jibber and Jabber: The titular protagonists of the series, Jibber and Jabber are seven-year-old fraternal (non-identical) twins. They have very active imaginations, and both share the same vision of their adventures. Jibber is distinguished by always wearing a red shirt and having dark brown hair and Jabber is characterised as wearing a green shirt and having strawberry blonde hair.
 Jessica: Jibber and Jabber's older sister, who usually figures as an antagonist in the boys' imaginary adventures. In real life, she is exasperated and embarrassed by their actions, particularly when her best friend Marcy is around.
 Jelly Roll: Jibber, Jabber and Jessica's dog. He is usually an oblivious participant in Jibber and Jabber's adventures.
 Marcy: Jessica's best friend.
 Mom and Dad: Jibber, Jabber and Jessica's parents, they are never seen in the show but can be heard occasionally their hands can be seen.
 Squirrel: He is seen in some episodes but is rarely seen by Jibber and Jabber. He is an enemy of Jelly Roll by constantly stealing Jelly's food and he is seen once with another squirrel.

Imaginary adventures types
 Pirates
 Astronauts
 Kung Fu
 Terror Laboratory
 Goth Victorians
 Superheroes
 Invisibles

Episodes

 Mission to Mars
 Pride of Frankenstein
 Pirates of Privacy
 Mutiny of Privacy
 Cartoon Satellite
 Flu Day
 The Wrong Stuff
 Do You See What I See
 Jelly's Belly
 Pirates of Nowhere
 Kung Food
 The Greatest Wall
 Enter the Jelly
 Book of Endings
 The Chamber of Perils
 Brain vs Brawn
 Night of the Werewolf
 Lady Jess and Ms Hyde
 Night of the Vampire
 No Such Things As Ghosts
 Space for Sale
 One Bad Asteroid
 Pirates Plunder Blunder
 Attack of the Giant Worm-a-Noids
 April Fools Rules
 Double or Nothing

Cast
 Ashleigh Ball - Jabber
 Kathleen Barr - Jibber/Mom
 Dorla Bell - Marcy
 Bill Mondy - Jelly Roll/Dad
 Chantal Strand - Jessica

Production
Jibber Jabber is computer animated by Northwest Imaging and FX (NWFX), a visual effects and animation company based in Vancouver), in association with Jibber Jabber Toons Ltd. for YTV in Monday, September 3, 2007. The series was the inaugural project for NWFX's animation division, and the company hired 25 full-time animators and added 17 Autodesk Maya 3D workstations specifically for the series. Although the entire series is computer-animated, it is rendered to resemble traditional stop-motion animation.

Broadcast details
The series was produced as 26 segments of about 11 minutes each, which are generally broadcast as 13 half-hour episodes.

The series debuted on YTV in Monday, September 3, 2007. The series has also been sold to KI.KA (Germany), Jetix (Latin America), TRT (Turkey), E-Junior and Al Jazeera Children's Channel (Middle East), RTP (Portugal), Arutz HaYeladim (Israel), BBC Alba (Scotland) and ABC (Australia).

Awards
In 2008, Jibber Jabber won four out of the five Leo Awards it was nominated for: Best Animation Program or Series; Best Overall Sound; Best Musical Score and Best Screenwriting. In 2009, the Production won a Pulcinella Award at Cartoons on the Bay, Italy for: Best Animated Character

References

External links

2000s Canadian animated television series
2007 Canadian television series debuts
2007 Canadian television series endings
Canadian computer-animated television series
YTV (Canadian TV channel) original programming
Canadian children's animated comic science fiction television series
Television shows set in Vancouver
Television shows filmed in Vancouver
Animated television series about brothers
Animated television series about children
Animated television series about twins
English-language television shows